Chorthippus jacobsi, the Iberian field grasshopper, is a species of slant-faced grasshopper in the family Acrididae. It is found on the Iberian Peninsula.

The IUCN conservation status of Chorthippus jacobsi is "LC", least concern, with no immediate threat to the species' survival. The IUCN status was assessed in 2016.

References

External links

 

jacobsi